Kasper Klausen (born 20 December 1982) is a Danish professional football midfielder, who currently is playing for Hvidovre IF.

Klausen joined AC Horsens in the summer of 2005, following the team's promotion to the Superliga, and was during the first season a regular starter for the team. He scored 2 goals and played his part in the team's surprising survival in the league. Due to injuries, Klausen lost his place in the team during the following season, and has not yet regained his former strength.

External links
Career statistics at Danmarks Radio

1982 births
Living people
Danish men's footballers
Hvidovre IF players
AC Horsens players
Danish Superliga players
BK Skjold players
Association football midfielders